Haven is the second studio album by Singaporean singer JJ Lin, released on 8 June 2004 by Ocean Butterflies.

Track listing
 "一開始" (In the Beginning)
 "第二天堂" (Haven)
 "子彈列車" (Bullet Train)
 "起床了" (Morning Call)
 "豆漿油條" (Perfect Match)
 "江南" (River South)
 "害怕" (Fear)
 "天使心" (Angel)
 "森林浴" (In the Woods)
 "精靈" (Elf)
 "相信無限" (Infinity)
 "美人魚" (Mermaid)
 "距離" (Distance)
 "未完成" (To Be Continued)
 "Endless Road"

References

2004 albums
JJ Lin albums